Parliamentary elections were held in Ivory Coast on 25 November 1990, the first since the restoration of multi-party democracy earlier in the year. Although 17 of the 25 legalised parties ran in the election, nearly half of the 490 candidates were from the former sole legal party, the Democratic Party of Ivory Coast – African Democratic Rally (PDCI). The PDCI won a landslide victory, taking 163 of 175 seats on 71.7 percent of the vote.  Only two other parties (plus two independents) got into the legislature, winning just 12 seats between them. Voter turnout was reported to be around 40%.

Results

References

Ivory
1990 in Ivory Coast
Elections in Ivory Coast
November 1990 events in Africa
Election and referendum articles with incomplete results